William Flanagan may refer to:

 William Flanagan (composer) (1923–1969), American composer
 William Flanagan (American football) (1901–1975), professional football player
 William Flanagan (politician) (1871–1944), British Member of Parliament for Manchester Clayton, 1931–1935
 William J. Flanagan Jr. (born 1943), U.S. Navy admiral
 William A. Flanagan (born 1980), former mayor of Fall River, Massachusetts

See also 
 Bill Flanagan (disambiguation)